Compeyre is a commune in the Aveyron department in southern France.

Population

See also
Communes of the Aveyron department

Notable people
 Mother Marie-Anastasie

References

Communes of Aveyron
Aveyron communes articles needing translation from French Wikipedia